Taneli Kuusisto (19 June 1905 – 30 March 1988) was a Finnish composer, music critic, teacher and choir leader.

His son is composer Ilkka Kuusisto, and his grandsons composer Jaakko Kuusisto and musician Pekka Kuusisto.

Filmography 

 Kirkastettu sydän (1943)
 Ihmiset suviyössä (1948)
 Opus 7 (1949)
 Kirkko suomalaisessa maisemassa (1956)
 Tunne maasi (1957)

References

External links

1905 births
1988 deaths
Musicians from Helsinki
People from Uusimaa Province (Grand Duchy of Finland)
Finnish male composers
University of Helsinki alumni
20th-century male musicians
20th-century Finnish composers